Irreligion in North Korea is difficult to measure in the country as the country is officially designated as an atheist state. The North Korean state persecutes those who stray from the official state-sponsored atheism and the personality cult promoted by the Juche idea. North Koreans, by Western definitions, would be considered non-religious but Buddhist and Confucian traditions still play a part in North Korean life.

See also

Religion in North Korea

References

Religion in North Korea
North Korea